Gratias is a surname. Notable people with the surname include:

 Arthur Gratias (1920–2015), American politician
 Denis Gratias (born 1947), French scientist

See also
 Gratia (disambiguation)